The fifth election to the City and County of Swansea Council was held in May 2012. It was preceded by the 2008 election and will be followed by the 2017 election.

Overview
All council seats were up for election. These were the fifth elections held following local government reorganisation and the abolition of West Glamorgan County Council. The Labour Party made substantial gains and won back control of the authority, having lost their majority in 2004

Candidates
The contests were fought by most of the main parties but Labour was the only one to contest all of the seats.

Overall Result

|}

Results

* = sitting councillor in this ward prior to election

Bishopston (one seat)

Bonymaen (two seats)
Long-serving Labour councillor Mair Gibbs was de-selected and failed to be returned as an Independent.

Castle (four seats)

Clydach (two seats)
Roger Llewellyn Smith has been elected as a Labour councillor in 2008.

Cockett (four seats)
Labour captured all four seats from the Liberal Democrats by a substantial margin. One of the four Lib Dems elected in 2008 stood as an Independent.

Cwmbwrla (three seats)

Dunvant (two seats)
Lib Dem councilor Nick Tregoning stood unsuccessfully as an Independent, leading to the loss of one seat to Labour who increased their vote significantly compared to 2008.

Fairwood (one seat)

Gorseinon (one seat)

Gower (one seat)

Sitting member Richard Lewis switched from the Independents to the Lib Dems.

Gowerton (one seat)
Ron Thomas narrowly failed in his bid to win back the seat he lost in 2008.

Killay North (one seat)

Killay South (one seat)

Kingsbridge (one seat)

Landore (two seats)

Llangyfelach (one seat)

Llansamlet (four seats)

Lower Loughor (one seat)

Mawr (one seat)

Mayals (one seat)

Morriston (five seats)

Mynyddbach (three seats)

Newton (one seat)

Oystermouth (one seat)

Penclawdd (one seat)

Penderry (three seats)

Penllergaer (one seat)

Pennard (one seat)

Penyrheol (two seats)

Pontarddulais (two seats)

Sketty (five seats)

St Thomas (two seats)

Townhill (three seats)

Uplands (four seats)

Upper Loughor (one seat)

West Cross (two seats)

By-Elections 2012-2017

Llansamlet by-election 2013
A by-election was held in Llansamlet on 4 July 2013 following the death of Labour councilor Dennis James. A former Labour MP held the seat.

Uplands by-election 2014
A by-election was held in Uplands ward on 20 November 2014 following the resignation of Labour councillor Pearleen Sangha. Peter May who lost the seat by 10 votes in 2012 won the seat back as an Independent.

References

2012
Swansea
21st century in Swansea